NCCC Mall VP formerly known as Victoria Plaza is the first shopping mall in Davao City opened in 1993. NCCC Malls acquired the mall and its complex on March 12, 2019 renaming and rebranding it its current name. The place occupies a gross land area of 81,000 square meters.

Before its acquisition, it is the oldest mall in Davao region. The said mall was also the first mall in Davao City and the second in the entire Mindanao after Limketkai Center in Cagayan de Oro which opened in 1991.

History 
The original Victoria Plaza was built in the early 1990s by the late businessman Robert Alan L. Limso through his Davao Sunrise Investment and Development Corp. The three-storey Victoria Plaza became a local icon as the first shopping mall in Davao City.

Mr. Limso, also known to be close to some politicians in the city including former President Rodrigo Duterte as he served as a city councilor from 1981 until he resigned in 1986 after the transitory government of the late President Corazon C. Aquino, eventually mortgaged the mall to a Philippine National Bank. Because of his failure to pay and the decline of the mall, the bank eventually possessed the property.

On 2019, New City Commercial Corporation (NCCC), a local pioneering retail player in Davao, has acquired the historic mall. The acquisition was sealed in a signing ceremony on March 12 with the Lucio Tan-owned Philippine National Bank (PNB) at the PNB Financial Center in Manila.

Future development 
NCCC presented a five-phase development of the 9.6-hectare property, where Victoria Plaza currently stands. The area is planned to a be mixed-use development with eight high-rise condominiums, serviced apartments, retail strips, lush green space, and a five-star hotel. The development is expected to run from seven to 10 years and the last phase of the development will involve the reconstruction of the original mall.

References 

Shopping malls established in 1993
Buildings and structures in Davao City